An Ideal Husband is a 1980 Soviet comedy film directed by Viktor Georgiyev.

Plot 
The film tells about Sir Robert Chiltern, who was a promising politician, an ideal husband and man, but got involved in a dirty business. Will he be able to save his marriage?

Cast 
 Yury Yakovlev as Sir Robert Chiltern
 Lyudmila Gurchenko as Mrs. Laura Cheveley
 Anna Tvelenyova as Lady Gertrude Chiltern
 Elena Koreneva as Miss Mabel Chiltern
 Yevgeniya Khanayeva as Lady Markby
 Eve Kivi as Lady Basildon
 Alla Budnitskaya as Mrs. Margaret Marchmont
 Igor Dmitriev as Vicomte de Nanjac
 Boris Khimichev as Jabez Kariba
 Albert Filozov as Tommy Trafford

Production team 
Screenwriter and director — Viktor Georgiyev

Operator — Fyodor Dobronravov 

Artist — Konstantin Forostenko  

Costume artist — Ganna Ganevskaya

References

External links 
 

1980 films
1980s Russian-language films
Soviet comedy films
1980 comedy films